Miratesta is a genus of freshwater air-breathing snails, aquatic pulmonate gastropod mollusks in the family Planorbidae, the ram's horn snails, or planorbids. All species in this genus have sinistral or left-coiling shells.

Miratesta is the type genus of the tribe Miratestini.

Species
Species within the genus Miratesta include:
 Miratesta celebensis P. & F. Sarasin, 1898

References

Planorbidae
Taxonomy articles created by Polbot